Gianluca Nicco (born 10 August 1988) is an Italian footballer who plays as a midfielder for  club Pro Patria.

Club career
After the bankruptcy of Mantova, he joined Serie B newcomer Pescara on 22 July 2010.

On 31 January 2012, Nicco signed a loan deal with Frosinone until the end of the 2011–12 season. Nicco was suspended for 3 years due to 2011 Italian football scandal. However it was shorten to 1-year by the appeal court of FIGC. Nicco appealed to the Tribunale Nazionale di Arbitrato per lo Sport of CONI. On 17 December 2012 the ban was shorten to 6 months, which would end on 31 December 2012.

He joined Perugia on 3 January 2013.

In the 2015–16 season he signed for Alessandria.

On 29 September 2020 he joined Pro Patria on loan with an option to purchase.

On 24 June 2021, he moved to Pro Patria on a permanent basis and signed a two-year contract.

International career
He played for Italy under-20 Lega Pro representative team in 2008–09 Mirop Cup. He also finished as the runner-up in 2008 Trofeo Dossena with the representative team, but not played in the final against Grêmio youth team.

In 2009–10 season he was call-up to the training session of Italy under-21 Serie B representative team.

Honours

Club
Alessandria
 Coppa Italia Serie C: 2017–18

References

External links
Football.it Profile 
Pescara Profile  

1988 births
Living people
People from Ivrea
Footballers from Piedmont
Italian footballers
Association football midfielders
Serie B players
Serie C players
A.S.D. Calcio Ivrea players
Mantova 1911 players
Delfino Pescara 1936 players
Frosinone Calcio players
A.C. Perugia Calcio players
U.S. Alessandria Calcio 1912 players
Piacenza Calcio 1919 players
Aurora Pro Patria 1919 players
Sportspeople from the Metropolitan City of Turin